Rathsman is a surname. Notable people with the surname include:

 Jonas Rathsman, Swedish music producer and graphic designer
 Otto Rathsman (1917–1986), Swedish diplomat
 Siri Rathsman (1895–1974), Swedish artist and journalist

Swedish-language surnames